Nyssodrysternum ptericoptum is a species of beetle in the family Cerambycidae. It was described by Bates in 1864.

References

Nyssodrysternum
Beetles described in 1864